Camping World Holdings, Inc. is an American corporation specializing in selling recreational vehicles (RVs), recreational vehicle parts, and recreational vehicle service. They also sell supplies for camping. The company has its headquarters in Lincolnshire, Illinois. In October 2016 it became a publicly traded company when it raised $251 million in an IPO. Camping World operates over 180 retail/service locations in 46 states, and also sells goods through mail order and online. It claims to be the world's largest supplier of RV parts and supplies.

The company is heavily involved in sponsorship of sports entities, such as serving as the title sponsor of Camping World Stadium and the Camping World Kickoff, which is played in the same stadium. It is also the official presenting sponsor of Major League Baseball's League Championship Series, NASCAR's Camping World Truck Series, and the National Hot Rod Association's Camping World Drag Racing Series.

History

Camping World began in 1966 with a small store in Beech Bend Park, an amusement park outside of Bowling Green which billed its campground as the world's largest. Campers at the park were requesting a store where they could buy supplies, so David Garvin—son of the park's owner—took out a loan and opened the store. Garvin amassed a large customer list as the years went by, which proved to be sagacious later when he added a mail-order division to the company. That division thrived, fueling the company's growth for years to come.

In 1997, Garvin sold the company to the current owners, Good Sam Enterprises (formerly Affinity Group), of Ventura, California.

In 2005, Garvin announced plans for a huge development near Franklin, Kentucky called "Garvin's". The development, described by Garvin as "a combination of Disney World, Camping World and Bass Pro Shops", will feature a large Camping World store with RV 250 service bays; a five-story, 650,000 square foot (60,000 m²) permanent RV trade show and exhibition area; a "free-range" campground with dry-camping sites; camping museum; and much more. Due to the recession, however, the venture never got off the ground and much of the land proposed for development was sold at auction in October 2011.

In early October 2016 Camping World raised $251 million in an initial public offering. The 11.4 million shares sold for $22 each. Marcus Lemonis co-owns the company with private equity firm Crestview Partners and plans to retain "substantial control" through his ownership of ML Acquisition and ML R.V. Group.

Operations

Under the Freedom Roads brand, the company sells RVs through a network of about three dozen independent dealers. In 2007, the company opened the Camping World RV Sales dealership; formerly known as Stout's RV. It is located on Interstate 65 south of Indianapolis, Indiana. Since then, the chain of dealerships has expanded to more than 100 locations.

The company also operates RVs.com.

In 2017, the company expanded into hunting and fishing gear by acquisition of Gander Mountain, which includes the Gander Outdoors and Overton's brands.

In December 2020, Lemonis announced a partnership with electric vehicle manufacturer Lordstown Motors. The deal will see Camping World act as the service and maintenance provider for the Lordstown Endurance pickup truck, as well as potentially marketing and selling the truck at their Camping World centers. Lordstown Motors will sell batteries to power Camping World electric trailers, as well as help design and manufacture an all-electric motor home at their Lordstown Assembly Plant. The motor home, dubbed the "Class E motor home/RV" is meant to cater to the motor home customers of the future.

Sports sponsorship
Camping World has major sponsorship involvement in sports, particularly college football and auto racing. In a 2020 interview with Autoweek, Lemonis emphasized the importance of a "conversion rate of familiarity" for sports fans—particularly those from racing series—into potential Camping World customers.

Since 2016, the company has held the naming rights to Camping World Stadium in Orlando, Florida, and also sponsors the stadium's Camping World Kickoff college football game. The stadium's bowl game was known as the Camping World Bowl from 2017 to 2019.

In 2017, the company became the inaugural title sponsor of Major League Baseball's League Championship Series.

Auto racing

Camping World's involvement in racing began in 2006 as a sponsor of NASCAR Busch Series driver John Andretti. The following year, Andretti would also race with Camping World sponsorship in the NASCAR Cup Series and Indianapolis 500. Other Camping World promotions during the 2007 season included sponsoring races like the IndyCar Series' Grand Prix at The Glen and forming partnerships with NASCAR team Kevin Harvick Incorporated. Camping World would also sponsor various races and teams in both series over the years, such as Cup driver David Ragan and IndyCar's Scott Dixon in 2017.

In 2008, Camping World assumed title sponsorship of the NASCAR Busch East Series and NASCAR Autozone West Series, dubbing them the Camping World Series East and West. Both series names lasted until 2010 when K&N Engineering became the new sponsor.

Camping World became the title sponsor of NASCAR's Truck Series in 2009, replacing 13-year sponsor Sears through its Craftsman brand (since sold to Stanley Black & Decker). The sponsorship started in 2009 and will last until 2022.

On May 8, 2018, NASCAR announced an extension of Camping World Holdings' involvement in NASCAR, including a rebrand of the Truck Series to the Gander Outdoors Truck Series, a move made as Camping World's 2017 acquisition of the brand has allowed them to brand the series with an outdoors store. After two years with Gander Outdoors branding (the second of which was as the Gander RV & Outdoors Truck Series), the series reverted to the Camping World Truck Series name in 2021.

In October 2020, Camping World acquired the naming rights to the National Hot Rod Association's pro series, branding it the NHRA Camping World Drag Racing Series. The sponsorship had been spurred by a tweet from Lemonis in September expressing his interest in supporting the NHRA after it had lost its title sponsorship with Coca-Cola.

In February 2021, in response to the previous season's Truck Series champion Sheldon Creed's truck running nearly unsponsored during the first two races of the 2021 NASCAR Camping World Truck Series, Lemonis made a "challenge" to all unsponsored teams for the 2021 Bucked Up 200 at Las Vegas Motor Speedway. His deal was to give teams $15,000 just to have the truck wrapped in Camping World colors and logos, $25,000 if the truck comes in the top 10, $35,000 for a top 5, and $50,000 if the truck wins. Numerous drivers and owners took Lemonis up on his offer, including Creed. Lemonis' sponsorship campaign continued in later races, with his other companies like Good Sam also being involved, and included supporting NASCAR Xfinity Series teams.

Ahead of its inaugural season in June 2021, Camping World became the title sponsor for the Superstar Racing Experience, naming it the Camping World SRX Series. The collaboration was led by Lemonis' donation to the Plating Change charity.

See also
 Good Sam Enterprises
 Good Sam Club
 Gander Mountain
 Stephen Adams

References

External links
 CampingWorld.com

1966 establishments in Kentucky
Bowling Green, Kentucky
Companies based in Kentucky
Lincolnshire, Illinois
Camping in the United States
Companies based in Lake County, Illinois
American companies established in 1966
Retail companies established in 1966
Online retailers of the United States
Companies listed on the New York Stock Exchange
Sporting goods retailers of the United States
2016 initial public offerings